Pizzo di Rodes is a mountain of Lombardy, Italy. It has an elevation of 2,829 metres above sea level.

Mountains of Lombardy
Mountains of the Alps